Talata Embalo (born 28 November 1963) is a Guinea-Bissauan amateur wrestler. He wrestled at the 1996 and 2000 Summer Olympics and did not medal.

References

1963 births
Living people
Bissau-Guinean male sport wrestlers
Olympic wrestlers of Guinea-Bissau
Wrestlers at the 1996 Summer Olympics
Wrestlers at the 2000 Summer Olympics